Bliss is the largest hamlet and a census-designated place (CDP) in the town of Eagle, Wyoming County, New York, United States. As of the 2010 census, it had a population of 527.

The community is in southern Wyoming County, in the north and central part of the town of Eagle. It is bordered to the north by the town of Wethersfield. Bliss is in the valley of Wiscoy Creek where it is joined by its North Branch. Wiscoy Creek flows east and south to the Genesee River, a tributary of Lake Ontario.

New York State Route 39 passes through the south side of Bliss, following the Wiscoy Creek valley. The highway leads east  to Pike and west  to Arcade. State Route 362 runs through the center of Bliss, starting at Route 39 on the south side and leading north  to Route 78 in Wethersfield.

Demographics

References 

Census-designated places in Wyoming County, New York
Census-designated places in New York (state)